

Peerage of England

|Earl of Chester (1071)||Richard d'Avranches, 2nd Earl of Chester||1101||1120||Died; Title extinct
|-
|Earl of Northampton (1080)||Simon Saint-Lis, 2nd Earl of Northampton||1109||1153|| 
|-
|Earl of Albemarle (1081)||Stephen de Blois, 2nd Earl of Albemarle||1090||1127||Died; Title extinct
|-
|Earl of Surrey (1088)||William de Warenne, 2nd Earl of Surrey||1099||1138|| 
|-
|Earl of Warwick (1088)||Roger de Beaumont, 2nd Earl of Warwick||1119||1153|| 
|-
|Earl of Buckingham (1097)||Walter Giffard, 2nd Earl of Buckingham||1102||1164|| 
|-
|Earl of Leicester (1107)||Robert de Beaumont, 2nd Earl of Leicester||1118||1168|| 
|-
|rowspan=2|Earl of Chester (1121)||Ranulph le Meschin, 1st Earl of Chester||1121||1129||New creation; Died
|-
|Ranulph de Gernon, 2nd Earl of Chester||1129||1153|| 
|-
|Earl of Gloucester (1121)||Robert, 1st Earl of Gloucester||1121||1147||New creation

Peerage of Scotland

|Earl of Mar (1114)||Ruadrí, Earl of Mar||1115||Abt. 1140||
|-
|Earl of Dunbar (1115)||Gospatric II, Earl of Dunbar||1115||1138||
|-
|Earl of Angus (1115)||Dufugan, Earl of Angus||1115||1135||
|-
|Earl of Atholl (1115)||Máel Muire, Earl of Atholl||1115||Abt. 1150||
|-
|Earl of Buchan (1115)||Gartnait, Earl of Buchan||1115||Abt. 1135||
|-
|Earl of Fife (1115)||Beth, Earl of Fife||1115||1120||Died
|-
|Earl of Strathearn (1115)||Máel Ísu I, Earl of Strathearn||1115||Abt. 1140||
|-
|Earl of Fife (1120)||Causantín, Earl of Fife||1120||1128||Died
|-
|Earl of Fife (1129)||Gille Míchéil, Earl of Fife||1129||1139||
|-
|}

References

 

Lists of peers by decade
1120s in England
12th century in Scotland
12th-century English people
12th-century mormaers
Peers